The 1987 Lilian Cup was the 6th season of the competition. The four top placed teams for the previous season took part in the competition.

The competition was played as a straight knock-out competition and held between 29 August and 1 September 1987.
 
The competition was won by Maccabi Tel Aviv, who had beaten Bnei Yehuda 2–0 in the final.

Results

Semi-finals

3rd-4th Place Match

Final

References

Lilian 1987
Lilian Cup